Global Goon's Family Glue was Johnny Hawk's first DIY record, released on J-HOK Records in 2004. It was well received, and Hawk continues to release records by himself (including Junior Glue and Pure Rock). It is his first release not on the Rephlex record label.

Track listing

"Electrostatic Bonj De Lonj" - 3:47
"Who Gonched Ya?" - 3:34
"Dead Weird Keks" - 3:25
"You_Set My Face On Fire" - 3:57
"Glory B" - 3:14
"Keep Yer Face On" - 3:11
"Frienchip Never Dies" - 3:14
"My Naem Is 'Johnny_Hawk'" - 2:53
"Hawaii" - 3:10
"Pause" - 3:30
"Family Glue" - 3:16

External links 
Family Glue at Discogs

2004 albums
Global Goon albums